Allen Kenneth Johnson (born March 1, 1971) is an American former hurdling athlete who won the gold medal in the 110 metre hurdles at the 1996 Summer Olympics in Atlanta, Georgia. He is also a four-time world champion.

Born in Washington, D.C., an all-round athlete, Johnson attended University of North Carolina at Chapel Hill and excelled at high jump, long jump and decathlon as well as hurdles.  He was the 1992 NCAA Indoor Champion for 55 meter hurdles but did not win the outdoor championship.

Career 

Johnson was troubled by injury in 2000 but still made the final at the 2000 Summer Olympics in Sydney, Australia, just missing out on adding to his medal collection by finishing fourth.

2003 in the Stade de France, saw Johnson win his fourth IAAF World Championships in Athletics 110 m hurdles title when he beat Terrence Trammell into second to overtake the three world championship gold medals that Greg Foster had won at the event.

At the 2004 Summer Olympics he tripped over a hurdle in the 2nd preliminary round and was unable to finish the race and reach the final. He was however ranked world's number 1 throughout 2004's season.

Johnson was trained by Curtis Frye, at the University of South Carolina where he served as a volunteer assistant coach. Formerly, the sprint and hurdles coach at the United States Air Force Academy in Colorado Springs, CO, Johnson is now the Assistant Head Coach at the North Carolina State University under Rollie Geiger.

His personal best is 12.92 seconds, only 0.01 seconds short of the then-world record held by Colin Jackson. Johnson has legally finished 11 races in less than 13 seconds, more than anyone else so far. His 12.96 (+0.4) set while winning the 2006 IAAF World Cup at age 35, is the Masters M35 World Record.  Johnson officially retired in July 2010, at the age of 39. Daughter, Tristine Johnson, competes as a 2014 senior at his alma mater University of North Carolina.

Achievements 
(110 Meter Hurdles unless stated)
1994
1994 IAAF World Cup – London, England
 Silver
1995
1995 World Championships in Athletics – Gothenburg, Sweden
 Gold
1995 IAAF World Indoor Championships – Barcelona, Spain
 60 Meter Hurdles, Gold
1996
1996 Summer Olympics – Atlanta, Georgia
 Gold, Olympic record
1997
1997 World Championships in Athletics – Athens, Greece
 Gold
1998
1998 Goodwill Games – Uniondale, New York
 Silver
2000
2000 Summer Olympics – Sydney, Australia
2001
2001 World Championships in Athletics – Edmonton, Alberta, Canada
 Gold
Goodwill Games – Brisbane, Australia
 Gold
2002
2002 IAAF World Cup – Madrid, Spain
 Silver
2003
2003 World Championships in Athletics – Paris, France
 Gold
2003 IAAF World Indoor Championships – Birmingham, England
 60 Meter Hurdles, Gold
2004
2004 IAAF World Indoor Championships – Budapest, Hungary
 60 Meter Hurdles, Gold
2005
World Championships in Athletics – Helsinki, Finland
 Bronze
2006
IAAF World Cup – Athens, Greece
 110 Meter Hurdles, Gold

References

External links 

 
 
 
 
 Allen Johnson's U.S. Olympic Team bio (archived)
 
 
 
 
 Curtain draws on career of 7-time World champion Johnson, article from IAAF

American male hurdlers
Athletes (track and field) at the 1996 Summer Olympics
Athletes (track and field) at the 2000 Summer Olympics
Athletes (track and field) at the 2004 Summer Olympics
Olympic gold medalists for the United States in track and field
Track and field athletes from Washington, D.C.
1971 births
Living people
World Athletics Championships medalists
World record holders in masters athletics
Medalists at the 1996 Summer Olympics
Goodwill Games medalists in athletics
IAAF Golden League winners
People from Irmo, South Carolina
World Athletics Indoor Championships winners
World Athletics Championships winners
Competitors at the 1998 Goodwill Games
Competitors at the 2001 Goodwill Games
Goodwill Games gold medalists in athletics